Signeta tymbophora, the dark shield-skipper or dingy shield skipper, is a butterfly of the family Hesperiidae. It is found in the Australian states of New South Wales and Queensland.

The wingspan is about 30 mm.

The larvae feed on Carex hubbardii and Gahnia sieberiana. They construct a shelter made by rolling and joining leaves together with silk at the base of their host plant. They rest in this shelter during the day.

External links
Australian Insects
Australian Faunal Directory

Trapezitinae
Butterflies described in 1902